BRAF may refer to: 

 Baton Rouge Area Foundation
 BRAF (gene)